The Last Voices of World War 1 is a six-part series screened on The History Channel in the UK from 9 November 2008 to 14 December 2008 with a repeat during the week. Its initial episode was screened on Remembrance Sunday 2008. The series was made by Testimony Films.
9 November 2008 – The Call to Arms
16 November 2008 – The Battle of the Somme
23 November 2008 – Saving the Wounded
30 November 2008 – Horror in the Mud
7 December 2008 – The Home Front
14 December 2008 – The Boys of 1918

The show features interviews shot by Steve Humphries and Richard van Emden in the early 1990s with many of the then surviving veterans who were, at that stage, well into their 90s. All of these veterans have subsequently died.

Harry Patch appeared in episodes 4 and 6, Henry Allingham appeared in episode 4. George Littlefair of the Durham Light Infantry appeared in episode 1.

The series was narrated by the actress Nimmy March.

The series was screened by Channel 4 in the UK daily from 2 November 2009.

The music for this series is called "Passage of Time" and was written by Terry Devine-King.

External links
 History Channel Homepage
 Article on George Littlefair who appeared in the series
 Norah Claye, who appeared in Saving the Wounded
Article in the Daily Record
 IWM Interview with Arthur Wagstaff, who appeared in The Battle of the Somme
 IMW Interview with Horace Gaffron, who appeared in Saving the Wounded
 IWM Interview with Thomas Dewing, who appeared in The Battle of the Somme

2008 British television series debuts
2008 British television series endings
2000s British documentary television series
World War I
Documentary films about World War I
English-language television shows